Ap Chau, also known as Robinson Island, with a size of  0.04 km² is an island in the Crooked Harbour, in the north-eastern New Territories of Hong Kong. It is located in Ap Chau Bay (Ap Chau Hoi). Islets located close by include Ap Chau Pak Tun Pai, Ap Chau Mei Pak Tun Pai, Ap Lo Chun, Ap Tan Pai and Kau Tau Shek.

Name
Robinson Island was named after Hercules Robinson, 1st Baron Rosmead, who was the 5th Governor of Hong Kong from 1859 to 1865.

Administration
Ap Chau is under the administration of North District. It is a recognized village under the New Territories Small House Policy.

History
The village on the island was set up by American preachers from the then Taiwan-based True Jesus Church in order to shelter fishermen and their families who converted to Christianity in the 1960s. Being so close to mainland China, before the transfer of sovereignty of Hong Kong the island was a magnet for illegal immigrant swimmers, one reason being that the well lit public lavatory block was something of a beacon at night. The single primary school on the island opened in 1958. There used to be over 700 inhabitants called the Tanka, an originally non-Chinese ethnic minority who were mostly fishermen but most have moved over to cities in the United Kingdom such as Newcastle upon Tyne, Leicester, Sunderland, Elgin and Edinburgh. The church on the island is still active. The island had 8 inhabitants as of June 2008.

Features
To promote tourism, in April 2018 the Ap Chau Story Room opened for public visits on Sundays and public holidays. 

Fresh water in Ap Chau is obtained from mainland China using an underground pipe.

Conservation
The northern part of Ap Chau is part of the Double Haven Special Area that covers 0.8 hectare and was designated in 2011. The Special Area includes the islets Pak Ka Chau, Yan Chau (both within Double Haven) as well as the islet of Ap Lo Chun and a part of Ap Chau (both within Crooked Harbour). The geology of the area is characterised by sedimentary rocks of the Jurassic and Cretaceous periods.

Transport
Kut O Village Rural Committee (Tung Lok House) Limited operates a daily kaito service to both Ap Chau and Kat O from Sha Tau Kok. But since the Sha Tau Kok Public Pier is in a restricted area, only restricted area pass holders are permitted to access the pier and take the kaito.

Best Sonic Industrial Limited operates kaito services to Ap Chau and Kat O from Ma Liu Shui pier on weekends and public holidays from 2018.

See also

Islands of Hong Kong
Outlying Islands
Fishermen villages in Hong Kong

References

External links

 Delineation of area of existing village Ap Chau (Sha Tau Kok) for election of resident representative (2019 to 2022)
 Pictures of Ap Chau
 Pictures of Ap Chau church
 RTHK program about Ap Chau
 How to visit two of Hong Kong's most remote islands in one day CNN.com

Islands of Hong Kong
North District, Hong Kong
Populated places in Hong Kong